Paulette Tenae Carlson (born October 11, 1952) is an American country singer-songwriter, who rose to fame in the 1980s as the founder and lead vocalist for the country band Highway 101. With Highway 101, she charted four No. 1 hit singles, seven Top 10 hits and won two Country Music Association Awards. As a solo artist, she has charted five times on Hot Country Songs and recorded three studio albums. Her most successful solo single is "I'll Start with You", which peaked at number 21 in 1991. Carlson continues to tour and record new music as a solo artist.

Beginnings
Paulette Carlson began professionally singing in the dance bars in Fargo, ND, and in the Minneapolis, MN, area and built a large local following before heading to Nashville in 1978. Soon after arriving in Nashville she was signed as a staff songwriter for the Oak Ridge Boys’ Silverline/Goldline Publishing Company. She signed a singles contract with RCA Records and released three singles: "You Gotta Get to My Heart",  "I’d Say Yes", and "Can You Fool".

Highway 101

Carlson founded Highway 101 in 1986 with session musicians Jack Daniels, Scott "Cactus" Moser, and Curtis Stone. The band was signed to Warner Bros. Records with Paul Worley producing. Carlson recorded three albums, a Greatest Hits package, and 12 singles for the group before leaving in 1991. Nikki Nelson replaced her as lead vocalist that year.

Solo
Carlson signed with Capitol Nashville in 1991 and released Love Goes On, which she produced with Jimmy Bowen. She also co-wrote seven of the album's ten tracks. The first single, "I’ll Start With You" charted at number 21, and "Not with My Heart You Don't" charted at number 68. A third single, "The Chain Just Broke", failed to chart, and Carlson exited Capitol. Also in 1992, she was nominated for Top New Female Vocalist at the Academy of Country Music Awards, along with Ronna Reeves and Trisha Yearwood, but lost to Trisha.

Christmas Is For You, a Christmas album, was released in 1993 under a small independent label. Carlson produced this album and wrote two songs for the project, "Christmas is for You" and "Mrs. Santa Claus."  Both songs were made into music videos, one where her daughter, Cali, appeared in the "Christmas Is For You" video.

Reunited with Highway 101
Marking Highway 101's Tenth Year Anniversary, Carlson reunited with original members, Curtis Stone and Jack Daniels.  They released two albums, Reunited and Latest & Greatest. "Where’d You Get Your Cheatin’ From", "It Must be Love" and "I Just Don't Love the Man" were released as singles (1996 and 1997).

Present
In 2004, when her brother Gary, a Vietnam War veteran, was in the hospital, Carlson was inspired to write a song called "Thank You Vets".  After writing the song, she came out of retirement and recorded a new album, penning 10 of the 12 songs. It's About Time (2005) was released under Pandean Records. She toured briefly after recording this album dedicated to our Vietnam Vets, doing mostly benefits for Military Veterans.

Today, Carlson has returned to performing and tours with a backing band called Montana Rising. She is currently represented by Gerald Murray Music, an independent agency which specialize in artist management, booking, tour management and the development of performing artists.

Discography

Albums

Singles

Music videos

Nominations
Academy of Country Music
 1991 Top New Female Vocalist

References

1952 births
Living people
American women country singers
American country singer-songwriters
Capitol Records artists
People from Northfield, Minnesota
RCA Records artists
Highway 101 members
Singer-songwriters from Minnesota